W. P. Irwin Bank Building is a historic bank building located at Rensselaer in Rensselaer County, New York.  It was originally built in 1873 and is a 2-story, rectangular flat-roofed, masonry structure on a stone foundation. A -story, four-bay flat-roofed brick rear wing was added in 1905. The building exhibits a number of Gothic Revival details.

It was listed on the National Register of Historic Places in 2007.

References

Bank buildings on the National Register of Historic Places in New York (state)
Gothic Revival architecture in New York (state)
Commercial buildings completed in 1873
Buildings and structures in Rensselaer County, New York
National Register of Historic Places in Rensselaer, New York
National Register of Historic Places in Rensselaer County, New York